Bob Davie may refer to:

Bob Davie (American football) (born 1954), New Mexico Lobos football coach, former head coach of Notre Dame
Bob Davie (ice hockey) (1912–1990), Canadian ice hockey player
Bob Hutch Davie (born c. 1932), orchestra leader, pianist, and composer of popular music

See also
Robert C. Davey (1853–1908), U.S. Representative from Louisiana